The politics of Montreal begins with residents of Montreal electing representatives to the municipal, provincial, and federal levels of government.

The Island of Montreal which consists of the City of Montreal and 16 independent municipalities, are represented by 18 Members of Parliament (MPs) and 27 Members of the National Assembly of Quebec (MNAs). Additionally, the Urban agglomeration of Montreal is composed of 16 mayors, 18 borough mayors, 144 city councillors and 38 borough councillors.

While people living in Greater Montreal are heavily divided on the issue of Quebec sovereignty, the majority of both groups tend to lean to the left of the political spectrum and thus centre-left parties dominate the city at all political levels.

Federal politics

The island of Montreal elects 18 Members of Parliament to the House of Commons in Ottawa. As of the 2021 Canadian Federal Election, the island of Montreal is represented by 16 Liberal Party of Canada MPs, 1 New Democratic Party MPs and 1 Bloc Québécois MP. The centre-right Conservative Party of Canada have not won a seat on the island since the 1988 election.

Provincial politics
The island of Montreal send 27 MNAs to the Quebec National Assembly. As of the 2022 Quebec general election the island of Montreal was represented by 16 Quebec Liberal Party MNAs, 8  Québec Solidaire MNAs and two Coalition Avenir Québec MNAs and one Parti Quebecois MNA.

Municipal politics

The City of Montreal is represented by 64 councillors at the municipal level. As of the 2021 Montreal municipal election, 36 of these councillors and the mayor are members of Projet Montréal, 23 are from Ensemble Montréal, 2 are from Équipe Anjou, 3 are from Équipe LaSalle and 2 is an Independent.

References